Alex Kuznetsov and Phillip Simmonds were the defending champions but chose not to defend their title.

Flavio Cipolla and Simone Vagnozzi won the title after defeating Jan Mertl and Martin Slanar 6–4, 6–4 in the final.

Seeds

Draw

References
 Main Draw

Internationaux de Nouvelle-Caledonie - Doubles
2008 Doubles